The European Parliament received delegations from several countries in the session from 1958 to 1979.

MEPs for Belgium 1958–1979
MEPs for Denmark 1973–1979
MEPs for France 1958–1979
MEPs for Ireland 1973
MEPs for Ireland 1973–1977
MEPs for Ireland 1977–1979
MEPs for Italy 1958–1979
MEPs for Luxembourg 1958–1979
List of members of the European Parliament for the Netherlands, 1958–1979
MEPs for the United Kingdom 1973–1979
MEPs for West-Germany 1958–1979